Christ Church is a Calvinist church in Moscow, Idaho, pastored by Douglas Wilson, and a member of the Communion of Reformed Evangelical Churches. The congregation has received international coverage for its views, which include advocating for a theocracy, its pastor's defense of slavery, and his teachings using the terms to "conquer" women and make them "surrender" to the supposed superiority of men. It also has a number of institutional projects, including a publishing operation (Canon Press), a magazine (Credenda/Agenda), a three-year ministerial training program (Greyfriars Hall), a private accredited college (New Saint Andrews), and a campus ministry (Collegiate Reformed Fellowship). The church is estimated to have between 900 and 2,000 members.

Beliefs
Christ Church is a Calvinist church, holding conservative views. It is a proponent of dominion theology and postmillennialism.  It is known for its promotion of Christian education and biblical courtship, and for its opposition to liberalism and feminism as being contrary to the Christian faith. Christ Church also holds to biblical inerrancy and adheres to the Westminster Standards, the Three Forms of Unity, and the Apostles' and Nicene Creeds. It is a charter member of the Communion of Reformed Evangelical Churches.

Affiliated organizations

New Saint Andrews College

New Saint Andrews College is Christian liberal arts college with numerous connections to the church's head pastor, Douglas Wilson. Wilson and a number of family members also teach at the school. One of Douglas Wilson's brothers, Gordon Wilson, a young earth creationist, is a senior fellow of natural history at the college. The school takes a classical Christian liberal arts approach to higher education patterned after the Harvard curriculum of 1643 consisting of small group recitations and oral exams. The college limits enrollment to no more than 200 students. Studies include "the languages, history, philosophy, and culture of classical antiquity and Western tradition in the light of Scripture".

In their Guide to All-American Colleges, the Intercollegiate Studies Institute, a conservative organization which promotes Judeo-Christian values, describes New Saint Andrews College as "intellectually rigorous and firmly grounded in the Christian tradition". New Saint Andrews College also offers graduate programs in Trinitarian theology and classical Christian education.

Greyfriars' Hall
Greyfriars' Hall is a ministerial training program affiliated with Christ Church.

Bakwé Mission
The Bakwé Mission is the church's foreign mission ministry to the Bakwé people of southwest Côte d'Ivoire. It consists mainly of translating scripture for the Bakwé Church, as well as training teachers to teach reading and writing to the Bakwé people.

Logos School 
The Logos School is nondenominational classical Christian school with numerous connections to Christ Church, which regularly promotes Classical Christian education. Logos School is organized as a limited liability company.

A number of former students of the school have reported that the school enforces modest dress, "Godly" gender roles, "prompt and cheerful obedience" to teachers, and the prohibition of romantic relationships between students. Former students have also reported being sexually abused and touched by teachers, spanked by school administrators, and asked about their sexual activities by teachers at the school. As of 2013, the school handbook allows spanking to be used as a form of punishment, as well as "any other measures consistent with biblical guidelines which maybe appropriate".

One student reported being taught that "the curse of Cain was black skin" and that "Black is the color of Satan and white the color of good".

Canon Press 
Canon Press is a publisher affiliated with Christ Church.

Controversies 
The church has drawn attention for its vocal opposition, and active resistance to federal and local restrictions meant to halt the spread of COVID-19. The church's leader, Douglas Wilson, has posted on his blog and on YouTube to call on his followers to "resist openly, in concert with any others in your same position", which he said would constitute "an example of a free people refusing to go along with their own enslavement". Wilson's remarks, which also warned "we are not yet in a hot civil war, with shooting and all, but we are in a cold war/civil war", drew condemnation from a number of other Evangelical leaders. Wilson has also drawn controversy for co-authoring the book Southern Slavery as it Was, which defended slavery in the Antebellum South.

2020 anti-mask protests
In late September 2020 Christ Church organized and promoted two anti-mask protests at Moscow's City Hall. The protests consisted of members of the church and local community gathering mask-less at City Hall and singing psalms and hymns to protest Moscow's mandatory mask policy which required people to wear a mask in public places or at large gatherings. These protests occurred on Wednesday September 23 and Friday September 25. At the Wednesday psalm sing/protest about 150 people showed up and five people were cited and three were arrested with the most notable arrestee being 2020 Latah County Commissioner Candidate and Christ Church deacon Gabriel Rench. At the second psalm sing/protest on Friday September 25, the protesters were joined by counter protesters who beat drums to try to drown out the singing. About 400 protesters showed up and no one was arrested. Charges against Gabriel Rench were later dismissed.

In February 2023, U.S. District Court Judge Morrison C. England Jr. ruled that "the City indisputably erred in interpreting its own Code", and that the church members ought never have been arrested in the first place, since the city ordinances explictly exempted both religious and protest activities.

Sexual assault allegations 
Christ Church has garnered widespread attention due to numerous allegations of sexual assault, rape, and pedophilia within the church's congregation. Church leader Douglas Wilson himself has appealed multiple times to judges and police officers to ask for leniency for church members convicted of pedophilia.

Douglas Wilson publicly asked for leniency in 2005 when Steven Sitler, a student at New Saint Andrews College, was convicted of sex offenses involving children. Following the student's release from prison, Wilson personally married him to a woman introduced to him by church leaders. One guest at the wedding suggested that Wilson preached that people needed to get married to contain their sexual desires. However, after the wedding, a judge ruled Sitler must be chaperoned around his infant son, after he admitted to feeling sexual stimulation resulting from contact with the baby.

In 2005, Greyfriar's Hall student Jamin Wright, then in his mid-20s, was put on trial following allegations of a sexual relationship with a 14-year-old girl. Church leader Douglas Wilson intervened in the case, asking investigators for leniency, and attempted to convince the judge in the case that the relationship between Wright and the accuser was a parent-arranged courtship. Ultimately, Wright was found guilty of "injury to a child". In 2013, Wright was again arrested, and convicted of domestic battery.

In September 2021, Vice Media published an article documenting a dozen sexual assault victims that came forward with testimony against Christ Church and its affiliated organizations. The article interviewed a number of ex-members of the church, who claimed that "women are told they must defer to church leaders and cannot say “no” to their husbands, men are taught to strictly control their homes, and those who speak out can be isolated and harassed". One former church member, and student at the Christ Church-affiliated New Saint Andrews College, told Vice that she felt compelled by the church to marry her boyfriend from New Saint Andrews, despite the constant rape and abuse she claims she suffered. Her wedding was officiated by the church's leader, Douglas Wilson. The woman said that other wives in the church reported that marital rape was common, and that when she went to church leaders to protest, they told her that a wife is not allowed to say "no". When she eventually divorced her husband and left the church, she reported that her car was repeatedly vandalized, and she received online abuse from church members.

A number of additional allegations stemming from anonymous sources have been documented on Christian blogs and YouTube channels.

Abuse allegations 
In May 2021, a former student of the Logos school launched a project on YouTube to document testimonies of students who report abuse at the school. The project claims to have compiled allegations from 27 different students, and its organizers claim that doing so has resulted in them receiving online threats, such as a picture of a knife.

Local influence 
Dating back to 2019, the church's leader, Douglas Wilson, has stated that the church aims to "make Moscow a Christian town", and favors "theocracy" as opposed to "civil governments, [which] are in necessary degrees satanic, demonic, and influenced by the god of this world, who is the devil". In a November 2021 investigation, The Guardian found that "Church figures have browbeaten elected officials over Covid restrictions, built powerful institutions in parallel to secular government, harassed perceived opponents, and accumulated land and businesses in pursuit of a long-term goal of transforming America into a nation ruled according to its own, ultra-conservative moral precepts". Said parallel institutions include "educational institutions, publishing houses, churches, and national associations". Many of these institutions, including New Saint Andrews College, are run by members of Wilson's family. One of the founders of the college served as the chief executive of the town's largest private employer, EMSI, which has hired about 10% of all of the college's total graduates since the school's inception. A local businessman, who spoke anonymously to The Guardian, said that the church had a large footprint in Moscow's downtown, and was attempting to attract ideological followers to the town through a large development project planned by a church "elder". Anonymous sources told The Guardian that members of the church were expected to pay at least 10% of their income to the church in the form of tithe.

According to a Vice Media report, there is a regular section in the printed church bulletin which lists the names of those denounced by the church. Some people whose names have appeared on the list have allegedly faced harassment from church members, as well as boycotts of their businesses.

References

External links
Christ Church Homepage
Canon Press
Greyfriars' Hall
New Saint Andrews College
Collegiate Reformed Fellowship

Evangelical churches in Idaho
Buildings and structures in Moscow, Idaho
Dominion theology
Conservatism in the United States